Anthony Layoun (born 7 February 1997) is a Lebanon international rugby league footballer who plays for the Mount Pritchard Mounties in the Canterbury Cup NSW. 

He was selected to represent the Lebanon in the 2017 Rugby League World Cup.

Playing career
Layoun played his junior rugby league with Merrylands Maulers and Wentworthville Magpies and represented the Australian Schoolboys under-15s team in 2012.

Layoun played in the Eels 2017 Under 20s grand final loss to Manly Sea Eagles 20-16.

In 2019, Layoun joined the Mount Pritchard Mounties in the Canterbury Cup NSW
On 6 May 2019, Layoun was selected for the Ron Massey Cup representative side to play against Newcastle Rebels.

References

External links
Parramatta Eels profile
2017 RLWC profile

1997 births
Living people
Australian people of Lebanese descent
Australian rugby league players
Lebanon national rugby league team players
Mount Pritchard Mounties players
Rugby league centres
Rugby league five-eighths
Rugby league fullbacks
Rugby league players from Sydney